Juliacks (born April 9, 1986) is an American artist, filmmaker, performer-choreographer, cartoonist, and playwright living in the U.S. and the Netherlands.

Her feature film, performance, and comics project, Architecture of An Atom, has been published, screened, performed and published at the Moderna Museum of Malmö & Stockholm, the Musee d'art Contemporain of Lyon, Centre d'Art Contemporain of Geneve, the Kiasma Museum of Art with the Helsinki Comics Festival, ALT_CPH in Copenhagen and other contexts in France, Canada, Denmark, Italy, and Portugal.

Published in independent magazines and anthologies internationally, including The Graphic Canon, Lumpen magazine, Insect Bath, Zeroquatre, Kutikuti, Windy Corner and Unicorn Mountain, in 2009, Sparkplug Comics published her collaboration with Olga Volazova, the comic book Rock That Never Sleeps. While in Finland on a Fulbright Grant for performance art, she made the comic art book and film Invisible Forces, that was taken on tour. Her graphic novel Swell premiered as a play at Culture Project's Women Center Stage Festival March 2012 in New York.

References

External links 
 
 
 Review of the play Swell, New York Times
 Review of Comics Swell & Invisible Forces, The Comics Journal

Interviews 
 UTNE magazine
 Impose magazine
 Theaterspeak

Living people
1986 births
American filmmakers
21st-century American dramatists and playwrights